This is a list of all episodes of the television series Owen Marshall, Counselor at Law.

Series overview

Television film (1971)

Episodes

Season 1 (1971–72)

Season 2 (1972–73)

Season 3 (1973–74)

References

External links
 
 

Lists of American drama television series episodes